Vilovo is a village located in the Titel municipality, South Bačka District, Vojvodina, Serbia. As of 2011 census, it has a population of 1,090 inhabitants. In the 1990s, after the collapse of Yugoslavia, the town saw a large influx of Bosnian immigrants which led to the nickname Panićovo due to the high number of residents with the surname Panić.

Demographics

As of 2011 census, the village of Vilovo has a population of 1,090 inhabitants.

See also
 List of places in Serbia
 List of cities, towns and villages in Vojvodina

References

 Slobodan Ćurčić, Broj stanovnika Vojvodine, Novi Sad, 1996.

Places in Bačka